Cédric Si Mohamed (born 9 January 1985) is a professional footballer who most recently played as goalkeeper for CA Bordj Bou Arréridj in the Algerian Ligue Professionnelle 1.

International career
On 2 October 2009, France-born Si Mohamed was called up to the Algeria A' National Team for a 12-day training camp in Alger in preparation for the 2011 African Championship of Nations qualifiers. On 3 March 2010, he made his debut for the team in a 4–0 friendly win over Liechtenstein.

References

External links
 
 
 

1985 births
Living people
Sportspeople from Roanne
Algerian footballers
French sportspeople of Algerian descent
French footballers
Association football goalkeepers
Algeria international footballers
Algeria A' international footballers
2011 African Nations Championship players
2013 Africa Cup of Nations players
2014 FIFA World Cup players
2015 Africa Cup of Nations players
Championnat National 2 players
Algerian Ligue Professionnelle 1 players
FC Gueugnon players
Moulins Yzeure Foot players
Jura Sud Foot players
FC Vesoul players
FC Montceau Bourgogne players
JSM Béjaïa players
CS Constantine players
US Biskra players
CR Belouizdad players
CA Bordj Bou Arréridj players
Footballers from Auvergne-Rhône-Alpes